is a Japanese animation studio based in Chiyoda, Tokyo.

History
The studio was founded by Kazuhiro Toda, board member of DLE in September 2009. The studio received investment from Asahi Production in April 2012. In December 2012, the headquarter of the studio was moved to Chiyoda and renamed to Gathering on September 1, 2015.

Works

Television series

ONAs

OVAs

Films

References

External links

  
 

 
Animation studios in Tokyo
Chiyoda, Tokyo
Japanese animation studios
Japanese companies established in 2015
Mass media companies established in 2015